Bob Sarles is an American documentary filmmaker, film editor and radio host based in San Francisco.

Biography
Bob Sarles is an American documentary filmmaker and a Primetime Emmy nominated film and television editor.

In the early 1970s, as a teen in the suburbs of Buffalo, New York, Bob Sarles began making 8mm films and videos using half inch reel to reel video. While still a high school student he attended workshops and screenings at Media Study/Buffalo, a regional development center for film and video makers that provided free access to film and video equipment.  Sarles received his bachelor's degree in broadcasting and film from Boston University, where he co-produced and edited the short documentary Fantastic, which had its television premiere on Showtime and later was broadcast on KQED-TV in San Francisco.

Sarles was admitted to and spent just one semester attending UCLA's graduate film school before taking an indefinite leave of absence in order to move to San Francisco, where he began his professional career as a film editor. He initially began working on documentaries, corporate and industrial films as an assistant editor and editor, eventually working on the editorial crews of independent and major feature films as an apprentice film editor, assistant film editor and sound editor, while also taking jobs editing music videos, commercials and educational films.

As an apprentice film editor and assistant film editor editor, Sarles worked on the post production crews of feature films including The Right Stuff, Henry & June, My Blue Heaven and Dirty Rotten Scoundrels. He was a sound editor on Breakin', Romero, and The Money Tree.

In 1986 Sarles founded his own film production company, Ravin' Films, which was incorporated in 2010. Sarles operates his production company with his longtime filmmaking partner Christina Keating, who is also his wife.

In 1991 Bob Sarles joined the staff of the famed special effects company Industrial Light & Magic, as the manager of the company's Commercial Editorial Department. There he edited television spots for clients such as Nike, Reebok, Chevrolet, Toyota and Miller Beer working with directors including Michael Owens, Steve Beck, Matthew Robbins, Joe Johnston, James Cameron, and Barry Sonnenfeld.

Bob Sarles co-directed (with Brett Berns) and edited the feature documentary film BANG! The Bert Berns Story, which had its world premiere at the 2016 SXSW Film Festival and has screened at the Mill Valley Film Festival, Seattle International Film Festival, Vancouver International Film Festival, Los Angeles' Don't Knock The Rock Festival, Chicago's CIMMFest and the prestigious DocNYC Festival in New York City and a score of other major film festivals and special screenings including the Grammy Museum in Los Angeles and the Rock & Roll Hall of Fame in Cleveland. The film, distributed by Abramorama, had its theatrical release in the spring of 2017.

He co-edited the Peabody Award-winning documentary series Moon Shot, for which he shared a Primetime Emmy nomination for editing, the ABC documentary The Story of Fathers & Sons, three of the first four seasons of MTV's ground breaking reality television series The Real World. and unscripted and documentary television series produced for NBC, ABC, Bravo, A&E VH1, Discovery, FX, WE, Oxygen and TVOne  including Million Dollar Listing Los Angeles Shahs Of Sunset, Ultimate Fighter, Kendra On Top, Braxton Family Values, American Chopper, The Mole, Making The Band, and VH1's  Basketball Wives. 

Bob Sarles edited award-winning music videos for a number of top rock, rap and country artists including ZZ Top's 1984 MTV Best Group Video Legs which was co-edited with Sim Sadler and also received best editing nominations from the MTV Video Music Awards, The Billboard Music Video Awards and the American Music Video Awards, and Green Day's video Longview which was nominated for the 1994 MTV Best Group Video.

Sarles edited the cult zombie horror film The Video Dead, and the feature documentary The True Adventures Of The Real Beverly Hillbillies. He co-produced and edited the feature documentary film Wrestling With Satan. He was principal cinematographer and co-producer of the feature documentary Son Of A Bitch!

Sarles was a producer and editor of VH1's Behind The Music and was a consulting producer on the PBS documentary Respect Yourself: The Stax Records Story. He directed and edited films that are on display at the Rock and Roll Hall of Fame in Cleveland, Experience Music Project in Seattle, and the Stax Museum of American Soul Music in Memphis.

Bob Sarles co-directed (with John Anderson) and edited the feature documentary “Born In Chicago” which premiered on the UK cable channel SkyArts and screened at the prestigious Palm Springs International Film Festival.

Sarles has directed music videos for Otis Redding and Jorma Kaukonen. Bob Sarles directed and edited the music video BALLAD OF EASY RIDER - Official Music Video - John Hurlbut and Jorma Kaukonen for the Roger McGuinn penned song "Ballad of Easy Rider" as recorded by John Hurlbut and Jorma Kaukonen for their album The River Flows. He co-produced, directed and edited the triple platinum selling DVD boxed set Rock and Roll Hall of Fame Live for Time Life. Sarles edited and co-directed (with Jay Blakesberg) the concert film Phil Lesh & Friends Live At The Warfield a live concert film featuring Grateful Dead bass player Phil Lesh with his band for Image Entertainment. He directed and edited the DVDs Fly Jefferson Airplane and John Lee Hooker: Come See About Me for Eagle Rock Entertainment.

Since 1995 Sarles has produced and edited two dozen artist tribute films for the annual Rock and Roll Hall of Fame Induction Ceremony for artists including Jefferson Airplane Dr. John, Janis Joplin, Buddy Guy, Crosby Stills & Nash, Little Walter, The O'Jays, Grandmaster Flash & The Furious Five, Traffic, Dave Clark Five, Black Sabbath, Paul Butterfield Blues Band, Pete Seeger, Buffalo Springfield, Miles Davis, Wanda Jackson, Little Anthony & The Imperials, The Ronettes, Patti Smith, Gamble & Huff, The Five Royales and The Ventures.

Through his production company Ravin' Films, Inc. Sarles produced a number of on camera interviews for the Rock and Roll Hall of Fame's ongoing Oral History Project with artists including: Al Kooper, Barry Goldberg, Eric Burdon, Frankie Valli, Jerry Moss, Stewart Copeland and Wayne Kramer. Bob Sarles has directed interview and behind the scenes shoots with recording artists including Sly & The Family Stone, Keith Richards, Van Morrison, Carlos Santana, Jorma Kaukonen, Don McLean, Norton Buffalo, Roy Rogers, Ry Cooder, Phil Lesh and John Mayer.

The documentary film Feed Your Head: The Psychedelic Era was produced, directed and edited by Bob Sarles as was the well received documentary film Sweet Blues: A FIlm About Mike Bloomfield that was included as a DVD in the Columbia/Legacy boxed set Michael Bloomfield: From His Head to His Heart to His Hands and screened at a number of film festivals.

Sarles was a producer and editor of  a two-hour television documentary “The Nine Lives of Ozzy Osbourne” produced for A&E and was post production producer and editor of the historical documentary “Marta Hari: The Naked Spy” which premiered at the Santa Fe Film Festival and aired on PBS America. He was an editor on the true crime documentary “I Got A Monster,” and is currently in production on documentaries about the late American satirist Paul Krassner, and the late singer-songwriter Dino Valenti.

In 2021 Sarles began hosting two weekly internet radio programs, “The Old Haight Ashbury Radio Show” and "Bob's Blues & All That Jazz" on the San Francisco community radio station Radio Valencia.  https://www.radiovalencia.fm/

References

External links
  Official Ravin' Films website
 Bob Sarles at IMDb
 Green Day Encyclopedia
 Jefferson Starship website

1957 births
Living people
American television directors
American television producers
American music video directors
Boston University College of Communication alumni
American film editors